Dibamus is a genus of legless lizards in the family Dibamidae.

Etymology
Greek διβαμος dibamos "two-footed, on two legs".

Species
The following 24 species are recognized as being valid.
Dibamus alfredi  – Alfred's blind skink, Alfred's dibamid lizard, Alfred's limbless skink
Dibamus bogadeki 
Dibamus booliati  – Boo Liat's blind lizard
Dibamus bourreti  – Bourret's blind skink
Dibamus celebensis 
Dibamus dalaiensis 
Dibamus deharvengi 
Dibamus dezwaani 
Dibamus floweri  – Flowers's blind lizard
Dibamus greeri  – Greer's blind skink
Dibamus ingeri 
Dibamus kondaoensis 
Dibamus leucurus  – white blind skink
Dibamus manadotuaensis 
Dibamus montanus  – mountain blind skink
Dibamus nicobaricum 
Dibamus novaeguineae 
Dibamus seramensis  – Seram blind skink
Dibamus smithi  – Smith's blind skink
Dibamus somsaki  – Somsak's blind lizard, Somsak's dibamid lizard
Dibamus taylori  – Lesser Sunda blind lizard, Taylor's blind skink
Dibamus tebal 
Dibamus tiomanensis  – Tioman Island blind lizard
Dibamus vorisi 

Nota bene: A binomial authority in parentheses indicates that the species was originally described in a genus other than Dibamus.

References

Further reading
Boulenger GA (1887). Catalogue of the Lizards in the British Museum (Natural History). Second Edition. Volume III. ... , Dibamidæ, ... London: Trustees of the British Museum (Natural History). (Taylor and Francis, printers). xii + 575 pp. + Plates I-XL. (Genus Dibamus, p. 435).
Duméril AMC, Bibron G (1839). Erpétologie générale ou histoire naturelle complète des reptiles. Tome cinquième [Volume 5]. Paris: Roret. viii + 854 pp. (Dibamus, new genus, pp. 833–834). (in French).

 
Taxa named by André Marie Constant Duméril
Taxa named by Gabriel Bibron